The British Paralympic Association (BPA) is the National Paralympic Committee for Great Britain (GBR), and is responsible for the United Kingdom's participation in the Paralympic Games.

The BPA select, prepare, enter, fund and manage the Great Britain and Northern Ireland team at the Paralympic Games. This team is known as ParalympicsGB.

Structure
 Chief Executive Officer: Mike Sharrock
 Chair: Nick Webborn, CBE

Arms

See also
Great Britain at the Paralympics
British Olympic Association

References

External links
BPA Official Site

National Paralympic Committees
 
Paralympics
2012 Summer Paralympics
1989 establishments in the United Kingdom
Disability organisations based in the United Kingdom